When the Heart Sings (Spanish: Cuando canta el corazón) is a 1941 Argentine musical drama film directed by Richard Harlan and starring Hugo del Carril, Aída Luz and José Olarra. A man from a wealthy background meets and marries an actress despite fierce opposition from his family.

Cast
 Hugo del Carril as Martín
 Aída Luz as Lucy
 José Olarra as Don Olegario
 Felisa Mary as Doña Angélica
 Oscar Valicelli as Pedrito
 Adrián Cúneo as Coco
 María Esther Gamas as Emma
 Julio Scarcella as Di Paula
 Vicky Astori as Gloria Norton
 Eva Guerrero as Mangacha
 Joaquín Petrosino as Juancho
 Fausto Fornoni as Garrido
 Agustín Barrios as Federico
 Julio Renato as El franciscano
 Alberto Terrones as Roncales
 King Wallace as El cuidador
 Emilio Fuentes as El ilusionista
 Warly Ceriani

References

Bibliography 
 Rist, Peter H. Historical Dictionary of South American Cinema. Rowman & Littlefield, 2014.

External links
 

1941 films
Argentine musical drama films
1940s Spanish-language films
Argentine black-and-white films
1940s musical drama films
Films directed by Richard Harlan
Films scored by Alejandro Gutiérrez del Barrio
1941 drama films
1940s Argentine films